Humberto Leonardo Guzmán Muñoz (born 9 April 1994) is a Mexican professional footballer.

External links
 
 

Living people
1994 births
Mexican footballers
Association football forwards
Atlético Morelia players
Club Necaxa footballers
Club Atlético Zacatepec players
Inter Playa del Carmen players
C.D. Tepatitlán de Morelos players
Atlético San Luis footballers
La Piedad footballers
Liga MX players
Ascenso MX players
Liga Premier de México players
Tercera División de México players
Footballers from Aguascalientes
People from Aguascalientes City